Mead House may refer to:

Nettleton–Mead House, Greeley, Colorado, listed on the National Register of Historic Places (NRHP) in Weld County, Colorado
Mead–Rogers House, Abilene, Kansas, listed on the NRHP in Dickinson County, Kansas
Alpheus Mead House, Cambridge, Massachusetts, listed on the NRHP in Middlesex County
 Hager–Mead House, Waltham, Massachusetts, listed on the NRHP in Middlesex County
 Jenkins–Mead House, Morristown, New Jersey, listed on the NRHP in Morris County, New Jersey
 Mead House (Galway, New York), listed on the NRHP in Saratoga County
 Osborn–Bouton–Mead House, South Salem, New York, listed on the NRHP in Westchester County
Mead–Zimmerman House, Greenwich, Ohio, listed on the NRHP in Huron County, Ohio
 Mead House (Pataskala, Ohio), listed on the NRHP in Licking County, Ohio

See also
Meade House (disambiguation)
Mead Bank, Waupaca, Wisconsin, listed on the NRHP in Waupaca County, Wisconsin
Mead Camp, Norfolk, Connecticut, listed on the NRHP in Litchfield County, Connecticut